Jurat ash-Sham'a is a Palestinian village located ten kilometers south of Bethlehem. The village is in the Bethlehem Governorate in the southern West Bank. According to the Palestinian Central Bureau of Statistics, the village had a population of 1,491 in 2007. The primary healthcare is obtained in Beit Fajjar where the Ministry of Heath have classified the care facilities as level 3.

Since the Six-Day War in 1967, the town has been held under Israeli occupation. The population in the 1967 census conducted by the Israeli authorities was 263.

References

External links
Jurat ash Sham'a village (fact sheet), Applied Research Institute–Jerusalem, ARIJ
Jurat ash Sham'a village profile, ARIJ
Juret Ash Sham'a aerial photo, ARIJ

Villages in the West Bank
Municipalities of the State of Palestine